A borg (short for blackout rage gallon) is a mixed drink made in a plastic gallon jug, containing water, vodka, flavored drink mix such as MiO or Kool-Aid, and sometimes electrolyte mix such as Pedialyte. The drink gained popularity at universities in the United States in the early 2020s, spreading among members of Generation Z on TikTok in late 2022 and early 2023. Drinkers typically label their borg jug with a nickname, often a pun on the word "borg."

Borgs have been touted as a hangover remedy and a harm reduction strategy, counteracting the effects of alcohol with water and electrolytes, but these claims are not grounded in scientific evidence. The drink's high alcohol content and convenient packaging also facilitate binge drinking, with a typical recipe calling for a fifth of vodka, equivalent to about 16 drinks.

Officials blamed borg consumption for a mass hospitalization event at the University of Massachusetts Amherst in March 2023.

History 

Borgs originated at parties at state universities in the United States as early as 2018. The drink's popularity grew throughout the following few years, largely due to video trends on TikTok in which drinkers shared recipes and punny nicknames for their borgs. The COVID-19 pandemic may have also contributed to the popularity of the drink, as it is typically consumed by one person and not shared, reducing the risk of germ transmission.

Claimed benefits 

Many advocates have pointed out advantages of borgs compared to traditional alcoholic beverages, with some touting them as a harm reduction method. One common claim is that the drink's high water content and inclusion of electrolytes may reduce the risks of binge drinking, including dehydration, alcohol intoxication, and hangovers. Borgs are typically made by the drinker, giving them more control over the contents of their drink than common party alternatives such as jungle juice. Harm reduction advocates have also noted that borgs, which are typically held by the drinker in a sealed jug, are less prone to spiking and germ transmission than traditional drinks.

Other proposed benefits of borgs include their flavor additives masking the taste of alcohol, their translucent jugs allowing drinkers to see how much they have consumed and pace themselves, and their sealed containers allowing drinkers to circumvent open-container laws.

Risks 

Medical experts have rejected the borg's claimed benefits, instead blaming the drink for promoting binge drinking. Many experts have warned that a borg's typical fifth of vodka, equivalent to roughly 16 shots, is dangerous for one person to consume, even when mixed with other ingredients or spread out over a full day. Some borg flavoring powder, such as MiO, also contains caffeine, which experts have noted can have dangerous effects when mixed with alcohol. Boston University health law professor David Jernigan noted that the borg does not "meaningfully reduce the risks of drinking," including alcoholic liver disease. Gus Colangelo, an Emergency Medicine Physician at Tufts Medical Center, claimed borgs are even more dangerous than traditional alcoholic beverages, calling them a method of "uncontrolled drinking." 

The risks of borgs drew national attention after March 4, 2023, when 46 students at the University of Massachusetts Amherst were hospitalized after consuming borgs during an annual Saint Patrick's Day celebration called the Blarney Blowout. Patients were transported to the hospital in 32 ambulances, a record in the history of the annual event. They were treated for a variety of alcohol-related issues including alcohol intoxication, but all were discharged without life-threatening injuries. In a statement, university officials said this was their first observation of notable borg usage and warned students about the risks of binge drinking.

See also

 Jungle juice
 Punch (drink)

References 

Mixed drinks
Drinking culture
Alcoholic drinks